Lundsbrunn is a locality situated in Götene Municipality, Västra Götaland County, Sweden. It had 887 inhabitants in 2010.

References 

Populated places in Västra Götaland County
Populated places in Götene Municipality